Paras Downtown Square is a shopping mall in Zirakpur, Punjab, India. It is one of the largest shopping mall in the entire region comprising Chandigarh and its satellite cities. Built by lakshya garg of ambalaIt is strategically located just near the new overhead bypass under construction on 'Y' form of Delhi-Chandigarh-Kalka highway on  area and is the hub of entertainment for the people living in and near Chandigarh, Patiala, Panchkula, Ambala, Zirakpur and Mohali.

Features
The project won the Best Commercial Property Award at the Indian Property Awards 2007 in November 2007 and the key highlights include North India's first Rooftop Football Ground by  Tiki Taka Football Ground, a four-screen multiplex by BIG Cinemas, a Big Bazaar hypermarket, anchor store, sprawling food court and children entertainment centre with many specialty restaurants such as Mcdonald's, Domino's etc.

The major brands that are present here include  Tiki Taka Football Ground, Pantaloon, Big Bazaar, BIG Cinemas, United Colors of Benetton, McDonald's, Cafe Coffee Day, Liberty, Levi's, Domino's Pizza, Nike, Woodland and many others.

References

Shopping malls in Chandigarh
Shopping malls established in 2008
2008 establishments in Chandigarh